Wagener Field at Monongalia County Ballpark is a baseball stadium in Granville, West Virginia. The stadium, opened April 10, 2015, is the home of the baseball team of West Virginia University (WVU), a member of the Big 12 Conference, and the West Virginia Black Bears, a collegiate summer baseball team of the MLB Draft League.

Construction
Plans were announced to build a new stadium for the West Virginia Mountaineers baseball team in 2013.  Ground was broken for the new ballpark at University Town Centre, an off-campus shopping and entertainment complex in Granville, adjacent to WVU's home city of Morgantown, on October 17, 2013.  The ballpark has 2,500 fixed seats with additional hillside and club seating, a fan amenity deck, and a park that is open year-round.  The field has a synthetic surface, other than the clay pitcher's mound.

In August 2014, the Jamestown Jammers of the Class A Short Season New York–Penn League, a Minor League Baseball affiliate of the Pittsburgh Pirates of Major League Baseball, announced that they would move to West Virginia, taking the name "West Virginia Black Bears", and use Monongalia County Ballpark as their home stadium. The Black Bears were affiliated with the Pirates from their inception until MLB's reorganization of the minors after the 2020 season. They then became a collegiate summer baseball team of the MLB Draft League.

As a result of inclement weather in February 2015, the scheduled opening of the stadium was pushed back to April 10, 2015.

Attendance
In 2015, the Mountaineers ranked 39th among Division I baseball programs in attendance, averaging 1,801 per home game.

Milestones

Awards
In the ballpark's inaugural season, it was named the best short season Single A ballpark in the country according to BallparkDigest.com.

See also
 List of NCAA Division I baseball venues

References

External links
West Virginia Black Bears: Ballpark Information
West Virginia University: Monongalia County Ballpark

College baseball venues in the United States
West Virginia Mountaineers baseball
Minor league baseball venues
Baseball venues in West Virginia
Buildings and structures in Monongalia County, West Virginia
Tourist attractions in Monongalia County, West Virginia
Sports venues completed in 2015
2015 establishments in West Virginia